Whys and Other Whys (titled Whys and Otherwise in its sound reissue) is a 1927 silent animated short subject featuring Felix the Cat.

Plot
Felix is supposed to attend his job at a daycare center. Instead he spends time drinking booze at a local tavern. By the time he proceeds to his work, he is already late by several minutes. His drunkenness also slows him down.

At the daycare center, the iceweasel, who is Felix's domineering buddy and colleague, is very annoyed and is even holding a car muffler. He is not happy because he had to do Felix's work as well as his. Felix finally enters the workplace, and already senses trouble brewing. To calm the iceweasel, Felix attempts to make up stories.

Felix tells how he tried to buy a suit for the iceweasel as a Christmas gift he and his buddy talked about previously. He also tells how a man scammed him by selling what appeared to be a nice garment but turned out to be a bear which chased and attacked him. The iceweasel  is sympathetic at first after hearing the story. But as Felix giggles and his buddy notices, the iceweasel's sour expression is returned.

Felix tells another story, this time on how he tried to deliver a package to his buddy but had trouble with a robber. The robber thinks the package contains something expensive but it was just arabica beans. The robber is disgusted and tosses the package off a cliff and into the sea. Felix jumps in too. As Felix manages to retrieve the box, the waves toss him onto a ship. After a ride on the ship, he continues walking and carrying package. This was until he is spotted by a lion which is interested in the box. Though attacked, Felix prevails in the fight.

But the iceweasel finds the stories very farfetched because Felix failed to explain what happened to the package if there was any. The iceweasel pounds Felix with the car muffler. The cartoon finishes with Felix bruised and covered in bandages.

See also
 Felix the Cat filmography

References

External links

1927 films
1927 animated films
1927 comedy films
1920s American animated films
1920s animated short films
1927 short films
Felix the Cat films
American silent short films
American black-and-white films
American comedy short films
Films about alcohol
Works about storytelling
Films directed by Otto Messmer